KWDF (840 AM) is a daytime only radio station broadcasting a Christian format. Licensed to Ball, Louisiana, United States, and serving the Alexandria, Louisiana area, the station is owned by Capital City Radio Corporation.

840 AM is a United States clear-channel frequency, on which WHAS in Louisville, Kentucky is the dominant Class A station.

FM translator
The KWDF signal is also relayed to an FM translator which provides nighttime coverage, although the coverage area of the translator is much smaller than KWDF.

References

External links
KWDF's website
Wilkins Radio Corporate Website

Mass media in Alexandria, Louisiana
Radio stations established in 1986
1986 establishments in Louisiana
Daytime-only radio stations in Louisiana
Christian radio stations in Louisiana